Alle Jahre wieder (English: "Every year again") is a well-known German Christmas carol. It is usually sung to a melody attributed to Friedrich Silcher, who published it in an 1842 song cycle based on a book of fables by Otto Speckter. 

Alternative settings stem from the pen of Ernst Anschütz and Christian Heinrich Rinck. The latter's is nowadays more frequently used for one of Hoffmann von Fallersleben's poems, .

Lyrics and melody

See also
 List of Christmas carols

References

External links
 
Alle Jahre wieder on Carus-Verlag's Lieder Projekt (audio, text and musical notation)
"Alle Jahre wieder" on lieder-archiv.de

German-language Christmas carols
Christmas in Germany
German folk songs
1837 songs
19th-century hymns in German